Nodouble (1965–1990) was an American Thoroughbred racehorse and sire. In a career that lasted from 1967 to 1970, he won eleven races from across the country, including the Arkansas Derby, Hawthorne Gold Cup (twice) and the Santa Anita, Brooklyn and Metropolitan Handicaps. He was twice voted American Champion Older Male Horse by the Thoroughbred Racing Association. After retirement to stud, he became the leading sire in North America of 1981 and was also a notable broodmare sire.

Background
Nodouble was a chestnut stallion, bred in Arkansas by oilman Gene Goff’s Verna Lea Farms. He was out of the mare Abla-Jay, who won eight races from 68 career starts and was bought by Goff in 1963 as a broodmare for $3,200, Her sire Double Jay was the 1946 American Champion Two-Year-Old Colt and a four-time Leading broodmare sire in North America. Nodouble's Australian-bred sire, Noholme, was the 1959 Australian Horse of the Year who took nearly a full second off the race record in winning the prestigious Cox Plate Noholme was purchased in July 1960 by Goff and brought to the United States where he raced until being retired to stud. Nodouble was trained by Bert Sonnier.

Racing career
At age two, Nodouble was competitive in stakes races for his age group but did not record a significant win. As a three-year-old, he began to blossom into a consistently good runner. Nodouble had not been nominated for the 1968 U.S. Triple Crown series, but after he won the Arkansas Derby  owner Goff paid a supplementary fee to enter the colt in the second leg, the Preakness Stakes. Nodouble finished third behind winner Forward Pass and went on that year to win the first of two straight editions of the Hawthorne Gold Cup Handicap and to defeat the great Damascus in the Michigan Mile And One-Eighth Handicap.

Racing at ages four and five, Nodouble was named American Champion Older Male Horse by the Thoroughbred Racing Association in both years. The rival Daily Racing Form award went to Arts and Letters in 1969 and Fort Marcy in 1970. His major win in 1969 was the richest race in California, the Santa Anita Handicap after earlier winning the Strub Stakes but being disqualified to second place. Traveling to the east coast, he won the Brooklyn Handicap and repeated in the Hawthorne Handicap. In addition, he ran second to Arts and Letters in the 1969 Woodward Stakes, Jockey Club Gold Cup and Metropolitan Handicap. In 1970, he started his campaign in California, where he won the San Pasqual Handicap in a track record time of 1:40 for  miles. Travelling back to New York, he won his final start: the prestigious Metropolitan Handicap while setting a new track record of 1:34 for the mile.

Stud record
At the end of October 1970, Gene Goff retired Nodouble. In 1971, he began his first year at  stud in California. After initially being unsuccessful both there and in Kentucky, Nodouble was moved to Florida to stand. He met immediate success while standing at Lasater Farm in Ocala, and by 1981 his progeny made him that year's Leading sire in North America. Some of Nodouble's prominent offspring includes:
 Double Discount (b. 1973) - set world record for 1¼ miles on turf
 No Class (b. 1974) - Canadian Horse Racing Hall of Fame, dam of eight foals of which seven raced. She produced six stakes winners, including four Canadian Champions
 Overskate  (b. 1975) - Canadian Horse Racing Hall of Fame inductee who was voted a record nine Sovereign Awards
 Mairzy Doates (b. 1975) - filly who won Matchmaker Handicap (1981), New York Handicap (1981), Japan Cup (1981)
 Shocker T. (b. 1982) - filly, Grade 1 winner, Calder Race Course Hall of Fame inductee

Nodouble died in 1990 having sired 91 stakes race winners and was the broodmare sire of 89 stakes race winners.

Pedigree

References

1965 racehorse births
1990 racehorse deaths
Racehorses bred in Arkansas
Racehorses trained in the United States
American Champion racehorses
Horse racing track record setters
United States Champion Thoroughbred Sires
Thoroughbred family A1
Chefs-de-Race